Karen S. Hesse (born August 29, 1952) is an American author of children's literature and literature for young adults, often with historical settings. She won the Newbery Medal for Out of the Dust (1997).

Early years and education
Karen Hesse  was born in Baltimore, Maryland. She studied math at nearby Towson State College and married Randy Hesse in 1971 before completing her studies.  She attended college at Towson University, the University of Maryland, and College Park. She earned a B.A. in English with double minors in psychology, and anthropology, during which she began writing poetry.

Career
After graduating, she moved with her husband to Brattleboro, Vermont, had two children, Rachel and Kate, took jobs in publishing, and started writing children's books.

Her first novel was a rejected story about meeting Bigfoot, but her next proposal was published by Henry Holt in 1991 as Wish on a Unicorn.

Out of the Dust is a story of a girl living through the dust bowl of the Depression.  The mother of the central character dies giving birth to her stillborn brother Franklin.  After the mother dies, Billie Jo and her father try to continue with their lives.

Hesse tackled a more disturbing subject in the 2001 verse novel Witness. The Ku Klux Klan, re-invigorated in the 1920s (in this book, 1924 and '25) tries to take over a small Vermont town. The book is written from the perspectives of several people -  Merlin Van Tornhout and Johnny Reeves, both members of the Klan; Sara Chickering, a farmer; Esther Hirsh, a six-year-old Jewish girl; Leonora Sutter, an African American girl; Iris Weaver, a restaurateur; Harvey and Viola Pettibone, shop owners; Reynard Alexander, a newspaper editor; Fitzgerald Flitt, the doctor; and Percelle Johnson, the town constable. In Witness Hesse continued the distinctive poetic/prose style she pioneered in Out of the Dust.

Hesse also wrote The Music of Dolphins, about a girl who was raised by dolphins.

Stowaway, first published in 2000 by Simon & Schuster USA, is based on the true story of an 11-year-old boy who stowed away on Captain James Cook's ship Endeavour in 1768. The UK version of this book is published under the title Young Nick's Head. It is in the format of a diary written by Nicholas Young, the cabin boy on the Endeavour.

Brooklyn Bridge is based on the true story of the family who created the teddy bear in Brooklyn in 1903.

At age 68 years, she was living with her husband, still in Brattleboro, Vermont.

Awards
Hesse was a MacArthur Fellow in 2002.

For Out of the Dust (Scholastic, 1997), she won the Newbery Medal from the American Library Association, recognizing the year's "most distinguished contribution to American literature for children", and the annual Scott O'Dell Award for Historical Fiction.

Letters from Rifka (MacMillan, 1992) won an International Reading Association Award and a National Jewish Book Award.

In 2012 Hesse received the Phoenix Award from the Children's Literature Association for Letters from Rifka, recognizing the best children's book published twenty years earlier that did not win a major award.

Works 
 1991, Wish on a Unicorn (Henry Holt, reprint Google Books edition, Macmillan, 2009)
 1992, Letters from Rifka (MacMillan, 1992) (reprint Macmillan, 2009)
 1993, Lester's Dog, illus. Nancy Carpenter (Crown)
 1993, Poppy's Chair, illus. Kay Life (Macmillan)
 1994, Phoenix Rising (Macmillan)
 1994, Sable, illus. Marcia Sewall (Henry Holt) (Google Books edition, San Val)
 1995, A Time of Angels (Hyperion)
 1995, Lavender, illus. Andrew Glass (Google Books edition, Macmillan)
 1996, The Music of Dolphins (Google Books edition, Scholastic)
 1997, Out of the Dust (Google Books edition, Scholastic)
 1998, Just Juice, illus. Robert Andrew Parker (Google Books edition, Scholastic)
 1999, Come on, Rain, illus. Jon J. Muth (Scholastic)
 1999, A Light in the Storm: the Civil War Diary of Amelia Martin (Scholastic)
 2000, Stowaway (Google Books edition, Simon & Schuster)
 2001, Witness (Google Books edition, Scholastic)
 2003, Aleutian Sparrow (Google Books edition, Simon & Schuster)
 2003, The Stone Lamp: Eight Stories of Hanukkah through History, illus. J. Brian Pinkney (Hyperion)
 2004, The Cats in Krasinski Square, illus. Wendy Watson (Google Books edition, Scholastic)
 2005 The Young Hans Christian Andersen (Scholastic)
 2008, Spuds, illus. Wendy Watson (Scholastic)
 2008, Brooklyn Bridge (Google Books edition, Macmillan)
 2011, "Nell" — a short story included in the young-adult anthology What You Wish For (Putnam) (also available on Tor.com)
 2012, Safekeeping (Feiwel & Friends)
2016, My Thumb (Feiwel & Friends)

See also

References

External links
 — Karen Hesse Blog: snapshots of a writer's life
 
 Karen Hesse at Macmillan US
 Karen Hesse at Scholastic Teachers

1952 births
Living people
American women children's writers
American children's writers
Newbery Medal winners
People from Brattleboro, Vermont
Writers from Vermont
Writers from Baltimore
University of Maryland, College Park alumni
Towson University alumni
MacArthur Fellows
21st-century American women